MIRACLE LINUX is a Red Hat Enterprise Linux-based commercial Linux distribution in Japan, developed and supported by Cybertrust Japan Co., Ltd. MIRACLE LINUX 8.4 is a CentOS 8 compatible distribution.

Overview 
MIRACLE LINUX Corporation, later merged with Cybertrust Japan in 2017, was established in June 2000 by Oracle Corporation Japan and Nippon Electric Co., Ltd. Originally developed and marketed a Linux distribution for enterprises market that optimized for  Oracle Database application.

In December 2003, Miracle Linux (Japan) and Red Flag (China) started a multibyte language-supported Linux distribution project named “Asianux”. Since then MIRACLE LINUX had been developed in the Asianux project for more than 10 years. After The Asianux project was disbanded in September 2015, MIRACLE LINUX had been developed in Japan by Cybertrust Japan Co., Ltd.  "Asianux" remains part of the MIRACLE LINUX product name.

MIRACLE LINUX is widely used in industrial equipment where long-term supported OS is required. According to a survey by Mick Economic Research Institute in October 2020, MIRACLE LINUX has a 57% market share of the pre-installed Linux distribution of industrial PCs.

Responding to the discontinuation of CentOS Linux announced in December 2020, license fee is changed to free from MIRACLE LINUX 8.4 released in October 2021.

Release history

See also 
 Asianux

References

External links 
Cybertrust Japan Co., Ltd. 
MIRACLE LINUX (Japanese only)

RPM-based Linux distributions
X86-64 Linux distributions
Linux distributions